Ricky Hampton (born June 10, 1992), known professionally as Finesse2tymes, is an American rapper from Memphis, Tennessee currently signed to Atlantic Records. He is noted for his "thunderous voice" and motivational statements in his songs. His major label mixtape debut 90 Days was released on December 2, 2022.

Career 
In 2012, when he was 21, Hampton, along with Moneybagg Yo, Blac Youngsta, and other Memphis rappers, formed the rap collective Memphis Greatest Underrated. The group released a self-titled EP in 2019. 

In 2019, he gained traction with the release of his mixtape Hustle & Flow. Finesse2tymes also had a fallout with Moneybagg Yo. In September 2022, both artists ended their feud and Finesse2tymes was signed to Moneybagg Yo's label Bread Gang. He also released his single "Black Visa" with the latter. In October 2022, he signed to J Prince Jr.'s record label Mob Ties in a joint venture with Atlantic Records. Also in October 2022, he released his single "Gucci Flow" with American rapper Gucci Mane. His single "Back End" gained traction on social media platform TikTok. In December 2022, he released his mixtape 90 Days with appearances from rappers Gucci Mane, Moneybagg Yo, Lil Baby and producer Tay Keith.

Legal issues 
In 2010, Hampton was convicted in Tennessee of two felony counts of aggravated robbery, and was given an 8-year sentence.  After serving six years, he was released in August 2016.

On July 1, 2017, Hampton was performing at the Power Ultra Lounge nightclub in Little Rock, Arkansas when multiple shots were fired. The following day in Birmingham, Alabama, he was taken into custody by the U.S. Marshals on charges unrelated to the shooting.  Federal prosecutors announced that Hampton was charged in connection with a June 25, 2017, incident, in which prosecutors alleged Hampton fired an "AK-style pistol" at a person in a vehicle after a verbal altercation outside a nightclub in Forrest City, Arkansas.  Hampton pled guilty to one count of being a felon in possession of a firearm, and was sentenced to five years in prison in December 2018. He was released from federal custody on July 1, 2022.

Discography

Mixtapes

Charting singles

References

External links 
 

African-American male rappers
21st-century American male musicians
Living people
Atlantic Records artists
1992 births
People from Tennessee
People from Memphis, Tennessee
Rappers from Tennessee
Rappers from Memphis, Tennessee
Southern hip hop musicians